Pilili is a reed wind instrument in Adjara, west Georgia. It is a pipe of 25-30cm in length with 5-7 keys.

Description
The main parts of the pilili are: trunk and mouthpiece. The stem or trunk is a tube about 25-30 cm long, on which 5-7 holes are made. The mouthpiece is a small tube, the length of which depends on the desired sound. It has a split it its sidewall, creating a reed that makes sound when a musician blows through the top tip.

The stem of the pill is made from Tkemli (Prunus cerasifera plum tree) or Didgula (Sambucus nigra) wood. In ancient times, tsipil (the tip) was also made from didgula wood, but today bamboo is used for this. The tone of the pilili is diatonic, it is arranged in one octave.

References 

Musical instruments of Georgia (country)